Psalms of Conscious Martyrdom is the third studio album by Sri Lankan heavy metal band Stigmata, released in June 2010. The album has been described as "an incredible journey through passageways of extreme metal with amazing technical dexterity, infectious melodies and heavy grooves to rip the skin off your bones". This is tripped out music that is powerful, memorable and mesmerizing." This is also the first Stigmata album to be sold online.

Track listing
 SpiralComa	7.11
 Purer (Libera Nos a Malo)	4.55
 The Summoning Cry of Aries	8.52
 Nothing    9.02
 A Dead Rose Wails for Light  6.18
 If Alpha Meets Omega    2.43
 Od(d)yssey   5.47
 March of the Saints    11.48

Album line up
 Suresh De Silva - Vocals
 Tennyson Napoleon - Rhythm Guitar
 Andrew Obeyasekere - Lead Guitar
 Javeen Soysa - Bass Guitar
 Taraka Roshan Senewirathne - Drums

References

External links
Encyclopedia Metallum

2010 albums
Stigmata (band) albums